Avaritia is the Latin word for, and personification of, Avarice or Greed.

Avaritia may also refer to:

 Avaritia, subgenus of midges in Culicoides species group
 Avaritia, a volume of the comics book series Cassanova 
 "Avaritia" (instrumental), by deadmau5